During the 1991–92 English football season, Notts County competed in the Football League First Division, having won promotion, via the play-offs, from the Second Division the previous season. It was Notts County's first season at this level since 1984, but ended in relegation after just one season and deprived the club of a place in the new FA Premier League.

Season summary
Notts County were unable to extend their stay in the First Division beyond the single season and were relegated from English football's top flight, along with West Ham United and Luton Town; to County's credit, they managed to steer clear of the relegation zone until late in March. However, County still remained in the First Division: due to the restructuring of the Football League as a result of the formation of the FA Premier League, the Second Division was renamed the First Division.

County's first game of the season saw them take on eventual runners-up Manchester United at Old Trafford; County lost 2–0. However, in the home match against United, in January, County managed to scrape a 1–1 draw.

Kit
Notts County retained their kit manufacturing deal with Matchwinner, who introduced a new home kit for the season. Nottingham-based brewers Home Bitter remained as kit sponsors, but for home games only; away from home Notts County wore kits sponsored by Edinburgh-based brewers McEwan's Lager.

Final league table

Results
Notts County's score comes first

Legend

Football League First Division

FA Cup

League Cup

Full Members Cup

Squad

Transfers

In

Out

Transfers in:  £1,730,000
Transfers out:  £2,080,000
Total spending:  £350,000

References

Notts County F.C. seasons
Notts County